The following is a list of sports stadiums in Canada.

By capacity
Canada's largest stadiums, ranked in descending order of permanent seating capacity.

By sport

Canadian football

Soccer

Baseball

Tennis
Aviva Centre - Toronto
IGA Stadium - Montreal
National Tennis Centre (Canada) - Toronto

Rugby union
BMO Field - Toronto, Ontario
Centennial Stadium - Victoria, British Columbia
Thunderbird Stadium - University Endowment Lands, British Columbia
Commonwealth Stadium - Edmonton, Alberta
Rotary Stadium - Abbotsford, British Columbia
Swangard Stadium - Burnaby, British Columbia
Swilers Rugby Park - St. John's, Newfoundland and Labrador
Twin Elm Rugby Park - Ottawa, Ontario
Fletcher's Fields - Markham, Ontario
Keith Harris Stadium - Ottawa, Ontario
University Stadium (Waterloo) - Waterloo, Ontario

Athletics (track and field)

Cricket

See also
List of Canadian Football League stadiums
List of indoor arenas in Canada
List of North American stadiums by capacity

Notes

References

Stadiums
 
 
Canada